Timeline of the COVID-19 pandemic in Ontario may refer to:

 Timeline of the COVID-19 pandemic in Ontario (2020)
 Timeline of the COVID-19 pandemic in Ontario (2021)
 Timeline of the COVID-19 pandemic in Ontario (2022)

Ontario
Ontario